Tsetserleg ("Garden District") is a sum (district) of Arkhangai Province in central Mongolia. In 2009, its population was 3,813.

The sum is located in the north of the aimag, both geographically and administratively separate from the aimag capital Tsetserleg.

References 

Populated places in Mongolia
Districts of Arkhangai Province